Homeodomain-interacting protein kinase 3 is an enzyme that in humans is encoded by the HIPK3 gene.

References

Further reading

External links